Lucius Chicco Banda (born 17 August 1970), better known by his stage name Soldier Lucius Banda, is a Malawian singer-songwriter, music producer and politician from Balaka, Malawi.

Music career
Lucius Banda was born on 17 August 1970 in Sosola Village in Group Village headman Kapalamula and Traditional Authority Nsamala in Balaka District of Southern Malawi. His music career started in 1983 when he was 13 years old when he started singing with his brother Paul Banda and leader of Alleluya Band. He first appeared on stage in 1985 with his brother's led Alleluya Band.

Lucius Banda started his music career while in elementary school at Mponda Full Primary School. To further his music career Lucius Banda decided to go to music school in South Africa. This dream was fulfilled in 1993 when he joined Dorkey house in Johannesburg, where he spent one full year studying music.

He recorded his first album titled 'Son of a Poor Man' at shandel music studio with the help of producer George Arigone (an Argentinian) on backing vocals. He had Nomhlanlha nkhize and the now famous gospel singer Debora Freser. His album became popular because of hits like Mabala, Get up stand up, Linda and Life On Earth. From there he launched his long career of music which takes him to date.

In 1997, Lucius Banda formed his own band, Zembani after recording his fourth album (Take Over) with the intention to help local and up keeping musicians in Malawi. Meanwhile many artists in Malawi have been promoted through the auspices of his Zembani Music Band. Zembani Band has grown into one of the most celebrated music groups across Africa. His music is loved by millions in Africa. He is well known as the voice of the poor and those who can not be heard. His music depicts the social, economic and cultural constraints faced by ordinary Malawians. He has also been a voice against social injustices and inequalities prevalent among African leaders and politicians.
He was controversial to Dr. Hastings Kamuzu Banda's regime. He was the first Malawian musician to sing openly against political oppression in Malawi during the decades of one-party rule.

Lucius has been host to many popular musicians, helping to begin the careers of Mlaka Maliro, Paul Chaphuka, Billy Kaunda, Cosi Chiwalo, Wendy Harawa, Emma Masauko, Enort Mbandambanda and Charles Nsaku. 

Lucius Banda has experienced the hardest of times as a musician as his music has either been banned censored and sometimes denied venues and segregated against by government.

In 2010 he released another album, 15-15- my song, which was banned by the state broadcaster, Malawi Broadcasting Corporation (MBC). In June 2010, Banda and other musicians from Malawi were invited to play in Germany. Their venue in Cologne was the key point for an upcoming 2011 Lucius Banda Europe tour. His travelling to Germany attracted a lot of public and political interest in Malawi. He released Thank you album in 2015. Currently he has nineteen albums to his credit.

In January 2021, he was admitted to hospital for high blood pressure and released 3 days later.  In May 2021, it was revealed that he suffers from kidney failures.

Political career

Until August 2006, he was an MP for the district of Balaka North, but lost his seat because he was convicted of having fake academic qualifications. He was sentenced to 21 months of hard labour in Zomba prison, but released in November 2006, three months and two appeals after his arrest. This experience inspired one of his albums, Cell 51 Maximum.

In the year 2010 he fell out of favor with the DPP led Government of the late Bingu Wa Mutharika (former President of Malawi). Malawians look to him as a mouth piece on political oppression. Meanwhile in the 2014 Tripartite Elections, Lucius Banda reclaimed his Balaka Central Constituency as Member of Parliament in which he won with a wide margin of 16,303 votes against his competitor who came second with 8,147.

Discography

Studio albums
 Son of a Poor man
 Down Babylon
 Cease Fire
 Takeover
 Yahweh
 Unity
 How Long
 Not Easy Road
 Money and Power

References

External links 

 Official Website
 Lucius Banda Music

1970 births
Living people
20th-century Malawian male singers
Members of the National Assembly (Malawi)
21st-century Malawian male singers